The New Forest by-election of 7 November 1968 was held after Conservative Member of Parliament (MP) Oliver Crosthwaite-Eyre resigned from the House of Commons due to ill health. The seat was retained by the Conservatives.

Results

References

New Forest by-election
New Forest District
New Forest by-election
New Forest by-election
By-elections to the Parliament of the United Kingdom in Hampshire constituencies
20th century in Hampshire